Helga M. Novak (pseudonym for Maria Karlsdottir; 8 September 1935 – 24 December 2013) was a German-Icelandic writer.

Novak was born in Berlin. She grew up in East Germany, studied journalism and philosophy at the University of Leipzig. She resigned from the East German Socialist Unity Party (SED) in 1957 in protest for the Soviet invasion of Hungary, which had taken place in 1956.

She moved to Iceland in 1961, where she married and had two children before her divorce.

She traveled to Spain, France, and the U.S., before returning to East Germany. When her citizenship was revoked for writing and publishing critical texts, she moved between Iceland, Germany, Poland, and Bulgaria. For a short period, she was an informer ("inoffizieller Mitarbeiter") for the East German Stasi. In 2004, German authorities denied her German citizenship. Novak died in 2013 in Berlin.

Awards  

 1968 Literaturpreis der Stadt Bremen
 1979/1980 Stadtschreiber von Bergen
 1985 Kranichsteiner Literaturpreis
 1989 Roswitha Prize
 1989 Ernst Reuter Prize
 1990 Marburger Literaturpreis
 1993 Gerrit-Engelke-Preis
 1994 Ehrengabe der Deutschen Schillerstiftung
 1997 Brandenburgischen Literaturpreis
 1998 Ehrengabe der Bayerischen Akademie der Schönen Künste
 2001 Ida-Dehmel-Literaturpreis

Works 

 Ballade von der reisenden Anna, Neuwied 1965
 Colloquium mit vier Häuten, Neuwied 1967
 Das Gefrierhaus. Die Umgebung, Hamburg 1968 (together with Timm Bartholl)
 Geselliges Beisammensein, Neuwied 1968
 Wohnhaft im Westend, Neuwied 1970 (together with Horst Karasek)
 Aufenthalt in einem irren Haus, Neuwied 1971
 Seltsamer Bericht aus einer alten Stadt, Hannover 1973 (together with Dorothea Nosbisch)
 Die Ballade von der kastrierten Puppe, Leverkusen 1975 (together with Peter Kaczmarek)
 Balladen vom kurzen Prozess, Berlin 1975
 Die Landnahme von Torre Bela, Berlin 1976
 Margarete mit dem Schrank, Berlin 1978
 Die Eisheiligen, Darmstadt 1979
 Palisaden, Darmstadt 1980
 Vogel federlos, Darmstadt 1982
 Grünheide Grünheide, Darmstadt 1983
 Legende Transsib, Darmstadt 1985
 Märkische Feemorgana, Frankfurt am Main 1989
 Aufenthalt in einem irren Haus, Frankfurt am Main 1995
 Silvatica, Frankfurt am Main 1997
 Solange noch Liebesbriefe eintreffen, Frankfurt am Main 1999

References

External links 
 
 Entry at Literary Encyclopedia
 Biography (literaturfestival.com)
  (Andrea Galgano - Helga M. Novak. L'esilio che trema)

1935 births
2013 deaths
Writers from Berlin
People from the Province of Brandenburg
German expatriates in Poland
Icelandic people of German descent
People of the Stasi
East German women
German women writers
German-language poets
International Writing Program alumni
20th-century German women